Richard Anthony "Ricky" Porter (born January 14, 1960) is a former professional American football running back in the National Football League and the United States Football League.

References

1960 births
Living people
People from Sylacauga, Alabama
Players of American football from Alabama
American football running backs
Slippery Rock football players
Detroit Lions players
Baltimore Colts players
Buffalo Bills players
Tampa Bay Buccaneers coaches
Denver Broncos coaches
Florida Tuskers coaches
United Football League (2009–2012) executives
Florida Tuskers